The Correctional Institution for Women (CIW) is a women's prison located in Mandaluyong, Metro Manila, Philippines. The prison is operated by the Bureau of Corrections.

The prison first opened on a  property on  February 14, 1931. Previously women were held at the Old Bilibid Prison.

When the Philippines had the death penalty, female inmates condemned to death were held at CIW. Ron Gluckman of Asiaweek described the women's death row as appearing like a secondary school.

Facilities
The Correctional Institution for Women has three different camps namely the Maximum Security Compound which consists of the Old and New Building, the Medium Security Camp and Minimum Security Camp.

References

Department of Justice (Philippines)
Prisons in the Philippines
Buildings and structures in Mandaluyong
Women's prisons in the Philippines
1931 establishments in the Philippines